Westerbeck is a district of the municipality of Sassenburg in the district of Gifhorn, Lower Saxony, Germany.

Geography
Westerbeck is to the east of the Neudorf-Platendorf district and to the north of Dannenbüttel. The Neuhaus residential area belongs to Westerbeck.

History
Westerbeck was first mentioned in a document in 1390 as Westerbeke.
In 1838 an inn was set up in the Moorvogthaus at Schiffgraben, for which the building that still exists today was built in 1860, which is operated as Gasthof Neuhaus.
In 1950, the Heinz Kunze peat factory was founded in the buildings of an abandoned prison camp in the forest near Westerbeck.
On March 1, 1974, Westerbeck was incorporated into the new municipality of Sassenburg

Coat of arms
In red, a silver (white) horseshoe over a silver (white) picket fence.

Politics

Westerbeck is represented by an eight-member local council. The local mayor is Annette Merz (CDU).

References

Sassenburg
Villages in Lower Saxony